Alan McCurrie (birth registered fourth ¼ 1953) is an English former professional rugby league footballer who played in the 1970s and 1980s.

Background
Alan McCurrie's birth was registered in Whitehaven district, Cumberland, England.

Playing career

County honours
Alan McCurrie represented Cumbria while at Whitehaven in 1977, and at Wakefield Trinity between 1978 and 1982.

Challenge Cup Final appearances
Alan McCurrie played  in Wakefield Trinity's 3-12 defeat by Widnes in the 1979 Challenge Cup Final during the 1978–79 season at Wembley Stadium, London on Saturday 5 May 1979, in front of a crowd of a crowd of 94,218.

Club career
Alan McCurrie made his début for Wakefield Trinity against Batley in the John Player Trophy on Sunday 24 September 1978.

Genealogical information
Alan McCurrie is the father of the rugby league footballer; Steve McCurrie.

References

External links
Statistics at orl-heritagetrust.org.uk

1953 births
Living people
Cumbria rugby league team players
English rugby league players
Halifax R.L.F.C. players
Oldham R.L.F.C. players
Rugby league players from Whitehaven
Rugby league hookers
Wakefield Trinity players
Whitehaven R.L.F.C. players